Oregon v. Mitchell, 400 U.S. 112 (1970), was a Supreme Court case which held that the United States Congress could set voting age requirements for federal elections but not for local or state elections. The case also upheld Congress's nationwide prohibition on literacy tests and similar "tests or devices" used as voting qualifications as defined in the Voting Rights Act of 1965.

Congress had passed the Voting Rights Act Amendments of 1970 requiring all states to register citizens between the ages of 18 and 21 as voters. The state of Oregon objected to the lower voting age, and filed suit on the grounds that the act was unconstitutional. The respondent was John Mitchell in his role as United States Attorney General.

The Supreme Court ruled by a 5–4 vote that Congress could set requirements for voter qualifications in federal elections, and by a different 5–4 majority that Congress could not set requirements for voter qualifications in local and state elections, but not even a plurality of the court could agree on the reasoning for these holdings. Only half a year later, the court's holding that the federal government could not mandate suffrage for 18-to-21-year-olds to vote in state and local elections was effectively rendered moot by the enactment of the Twenty-sixth Amendment.

Opinion of the Court
The opinion of the Court was written by Hugo Black.  The remaining eight justices were split 4-4 on whether Congress had power to set requirements for voter qualifications in any elections, regardless of whether they were state or federal.  Black's vote was therefore decisive on both questions.  Although it was styled "the opinion of the court", no other justice joined Black's opinion, rendering his reasoning non-precedential.

Congressional elections
The first question to be addressed was the right of Congress to override minimum voting ages set by states for federal Congressional elections.  Article I of the Constitution states that, in elections for the U.S. House of Representatives, "Electors in each State shall have the Qualifications requisite for Electors of the most numerous Branch of the State Legislature". The Seventeenth Amendment extends the same requirement to elections for the U.S. Senate.  Article I furthermore gives states the right prescribe the "Times, Places and Manner of holding Elections for Senators and Representatives", but also states that "Congress may at any time by Law make or alter such Regulations".

Justice Black's opinion stated that, according to a "long line of decisions in this Court", "Congress has ultimate supervisory power over congressional elections".  Black wrote that Congress had the undisputed right (under the "Times, Places and Manner" clause) to regulate the drawing of electoral districts, and went on to argue that "no voter qualification was more important to the Framers than the geographical qualification embodied in the concept of congressional districts", adding that "the power to alter congressional district lines is vastly more significant in its effect than the power to permit 18-year-old citizens to go to the polls and vote in all federal elections".  Black further argued that the phrase "such Regulations" (in the "Times, Places and Manner" clause) must be interpreted to encompass "regulations of the same general character that the legislature of the State is authorized to prescribe with respect to congressional elections".

Black's opinion therefore upheld the right of Congress to override state voting-age restrictions applying to federal Congressional elections.

Presidential elections
Article II of the Constitution states that "[e]ach State shall appoint" its Presidential Electors
"in such Manner as the Legislature, thereof may direct".  Black's opinion held that, despite this language, Congress has the right to override state laws on minimum voting age in Presidential elections.  He reasoned that "[i]t cannot seriously contend that Congress has less power over the conduct of presidential elections than it has over congressional elections."

State and local elections
Black's opinion stated that Congress did not have power to override state minimum voting ages for state elections, because "the Constitution was also intended to preserve to the States the power that even the Colonies had to establish and maintain their own separate and independent governments".

Other opinions

Douglas
Justice Douglas would have held that the Congressional act was valid as applied to all elections (both state and federal), as an exercise of Congress's power to enforce the Equal Protection Clause of the Fourteenth Amendment.

Brennan
Justice Brennan, joined by Justices White and Marshall, likewise argued that the Act of Congress was a valid exercise of Congress's power to enforce the Fourteenth Amendment.

Harlan
In a lengthy dissent, Justice Harlan began by attacking the reasoning of Douglas and Brennan opinions, undertaking a detailed historical analysis of the circumstances surrounding the passage of the Fourteenth Amendment.  He concluded that "the suggestion that members of the age group between 18 and 21 are threatened with unconstitutional discrimination, or that any hypothetical discrimination is likely to be affected by lowering the voting age, is little short of fanciful".

Harlan then attacked Black's reasoning that Congress had the power to regulate voting age in federal elections. Focusing on the explicit words of the Constitution, Harlan stated that "[i]t is difficult to see how words could be clearer in stating what Congress can control and what it cannot control".

Stewart
Stewart's opinion, joined by Chief Justice Burger and Justice Blackmun, agreed with Harlan that the Constitution gives states the power to set voting qualifications.  In a footnote, Stewart pointed out that the Fourteenth Amendment itself used a voting age of 21 for the purpose of calculating the basis of states' representation in Congress, and therefore "so long as a State does not set the voting age higher than 21, the reasonableness of its choice is confirmed by the very Fourteenth Amendment upon which the Government relies".

Enforcement
Enforcement of this ruling might have proven to be problematic, since states not lowering the voting age to the age of 18 for state elections would have had to provide special federal-election only ballots to citizens between 18 and 20 voting in federal elections. Such states would have had to maintain two sets of voting registries, one for those between the ages of 18 to 20 and another for those 21 and older.

The question became moot with the prompt ratification of the Twenty-sixth Amendment the next year, which prohibited both the states and the federal government from denying the vote to citizens over the age of 18 on account of age.
Though Oregon v. Mitchell affirmed the federal government's power to set a minimum voting age for federal elections, no case has tested whether the federal government possesses the power to prevent states from lowering their voting age below 18, since the federal government has not tried to prohibit states from doing so.

See also
 List of United States Supreme Court cases, volume 400
United States v. Butler, 
Carter v. Carter Coal Co.,

References

Further reading

External links

 

United States Supreme Court cases
United States Supreme Court original jurisdiction cases
1970 in United States case law
1970 in Oregon
Abrogated United States Supreme Court decisions
United States elections case law
United States Supreme Court cases of the Burger Court